America vs. The Justice Society is a four-issue comic book mini-series starring the Justice Society of America which was first published by DC Comics between January and April 1985.

The series was written by Roy and Dann Thomas and featured artwork from Rafael Kayanan, Rich Buckler and Jerry Ordway among others.

Plot
The series was set on Earth-Two and began with the discovery of Batman's diary (the Pre-Crisis Earth-Two Bruce Wayne had been murdered by a criminal named Bill Jensen prior to this adventure as indicated in this story) which indicated that the Justice Society was guilty of treason during World War II and conspired to cover up their treason after the war was over.
 
The group is put on trial and their history is reviewed. All the historical adventures involving the JSA are recalled, and details are added. It eventually reveals that the diary is a hoax created by Batman in an effort to have the JSA apprehend Per Degaton at a future time that Batman believed he would not be alive for. Degaton is apprehended by the Justice Society, but he apparently commits suicide at the end of the story (though he would return in later stories; these are younger versions of the character, so it may simply be that this fate was still in his future, at least prior to the events of Crisis on Infinite Earths and its follow-up series Infinite Crisis). This overall premise was inspired by the then-recent revelation that the so-called Hitler Diaries that had been published were, in fact, fakes.

One major part of the story (#2, "Trial by Congress") depicted the events which surrounded the retirement of the Justice Society in 1951. It showed how the team chose to disband rather than appear in front of the House Un-American Activities Committee, which demanded that they unmask themselves (this committee was modeled after the real-life U.S. government proceedings in the 1950s that were part of McCarthyism). Those events had been explored in more detail in a story in Adventure Comics #466 ("The Defeat of the Justice Society!"; December 1979) by writer Paul Levitz, which was the longest (and last) JSA story in Adventure prior to the cancellation of the series. Throughout the series of AvJS, many other past JSA stories were similarly retold as part of the examination of their history which took place at their trial (covering all of their cases originally published in All-Star Comics #3-57, All-Star'''s revival in the 1970s (#58-74), all of the JLA/JSA team-ups told in the pages of Justice League of America up to that point, the cases in Adventure Comics, and the cases told in All-Star Squadron'' up to that point).

References

1985 comics debuts
Comics by Roy Thomas
Earth-Two
Justice Society of America